Making Do is a 1963 novel written by Paul Goodman and published by Macmillan.

Synopsis 

The "Banning the Cars from New York" chapter begins with a spontaneous youth handball game played on the wall of a store. When its owner calls the police to end the game, the boy chastizes the narrator for not intervening, for "betraying natural society". The narrator emotionally navigates the conversation and later that evening speaks on a metropolitan radio broadcast about social issues and transportation, proposing how private automobiles could be banned and the streets could be reclaimed for leisure.

Publication 

The Macmillan Company first printed Making Do in November 1963. A paperback edition followed in October 1964 with New American Library's Signet imprint. The book incorporated previous works by Goodman, such as his 1961 proposal for banning cars from Manhattan and two short stories: "Eagle's Bridge: The Death of a Dog" (1962) and "At the Lawyer's" (1963).

Goodman referred to Making Do, along with Parents' Day and The Break-Up of Our Camp as his three "community novels". The work is autobiographical fiction with its central character as a middle-aged social critic, i.e., Goodman.

Analysis and legacy 

Theodore Roszak wrote that the "Banning the Cars from New York" chapter encapsulated Goodman's ethos in building from spontaneous human joy into addressing a structural civic issue. It begins with Goodman's emphasis on unperturbed animal impulse, such as child's play or the narrator's physical love for the boy, and extrapolates into a larger societal concern and analysis.

Goodman's fictional works received little critical recognition, according to a bibliographer of his works.

The New York Times described Making Do as "a poor novel and a very interesting book" and that despite the narrator's similarity with the author, the narrator becomes a "bore".

References

Bibliography

External links 

 Full text (public domain) from HathiTrust
 

1963 American novels
Books by Paul Goodman
English-language books
Macmillan Publishers books